The 2021 British Columbia wildfires burned across the Canadian province of British Columbia. The severity of the 2021 wildfire season is believed to have been caused by a "perfect storm" of environmental factors exacerbated by human-caused climate change.

As of August 16, over 1,500 fires had been recorded according to the BC Wildfire Service. The Sparks Lake Fire was the largest fire burning in the province, having burned an estimated 95,980 hectares (237,172 acres) of the Bonaparte Plateau northwest of the city of Kamloops.

Development
A heat dome gripped the province of British Columbia, and much of Western North America, from June 25–30, 2021, increasing the risk of wildfires.

By July 1, 2021, almost 500 wildfires were burning across British Columbia. On July 20 the B.C. government declared a state of emergency.

Wildfires

More up to date information is available using this interactive map; BC Wildfire Service Map

References

See also 
List of disasters in Canada
2021 Western North America heat wave

 
Wildfires in Canada
2021 wildfires in North America
2021 in British Columbia
Natural disasters in British Columbia
June 2021 events in Canada
July 2021 events in Canada
2021 disasters in Canada